The 1992 Puerto Rican general elections were held in Puerto Rico on 3 November 1992. Pedro Rosselló of the New Progressive Party (PNP) was elected Governor, whilst the PNP also won a majority of seats in the House of Representatives and the Senate. Voter turnout was between 82% and 84%.

Results

Governor

Resident Commissioner

House of Representatives

Senate

References

1992 elections in the Caribbean
1992
Elections
Puerto Rico